Flash-bang may refer to:

Stun grenade, a less-lethal explosive device used to temporarily disorient an enemy's senses
Artillery sound ranging, a method of determining the coordinates of a hostile battery using data derived from the sound of its guns (or mortar or rockets) firing